Ralph Joseph P. Burns (June 29, 1922 – November 21, 2001) was an American jazz pianist, composer, and arranger.

Early life
Burns was born in Newton, Massachusetts, United States, where he began playing the piano as a child. In 1938, he attended the New England Conservatory of Music.  He admitted that he learned the most about jazz by transcribing the works of Count Basie, Benny Goodman and Duke Ellington. While a student, Burns lived in  the home of Frances Wayne. Wayne was an established big band singer and her brother Nick Jerret was a bandleader who began working with Burns. He found himself in the company of such performers as Nat King Cole and Art Tatum.

Career
After Burns moved to New York in the early 1940s, he met Charlie Barnet and the two men began working together.  In 1944, he joined the Woody Herman band with members Neal Hefti, Bill Harris, Flip Phillips, Chubby Jackson and Dave Tough. Together, the group developed Herman's sound. For 15 years, Burns wrote or arranged many of the band's major hits including "Bijou", "Northwest Passage" and "Apple Honey", and on the longer work "Lady McGowan's Dream" and the three-part Summer Sequence.

Burns worked with many other musicians. Herman band member Stan Getz was featured as a tenor saxophone soloist on "Early Autumn", a hit for the band and the launching platform for Getz's solo career. Burns also worked in a small band with soloists including Bill Harris and Charlie Ventura.

The success of the Herman band provided Burns the ability to record under his own name. In the 1950s, Burns played nightly from 5pm -9pm in The Baroque Room at Oscar's Delmonico restaurant in Downtown Manhattan. He collaborated with Billy Strayhorn, Lee Konitz and Ben Webster to create both jazz and classical recordings.  He wrote compositions for Tony Bennett and Johnny Mathis and later Aretha Franklin and Natalie Cole.  Burns was responsible for the arrangement and introduction of a string orchestra on two of Ray Charles's biggest hits, "Come Rain or Come Shine" and "Georgia on My Mind". In the 1990s, Burns arranged music for Mel Tormé, John Pizzarelli, Michael Feinstein and Tony Bennett.

In the 1960s, Burns was no longer touring as a band pianist, and began arranging/orchestrating for Broadway shows including Chicago, Funny Girl, No, No, Nanette, and Sweet Charity.  In 1971, Burns first film score assignment was for Woody Allen's Bananas. Burns worked with film-director Bob Fosse and won the Academy Award as music supervisor for Cabaret (1972). He composed the film scores for Lenny (1974) and Martin Scorsese's jazz-themed New York, New York (1977). Fosse again employed Burns to create the soundtrack for All That Jazz (1979) for which he also won an Academy Award.  He then worked on Urban Cowboy (1980). Burns received another Academy Award nomination for his work in Annie (1982).

Baryshnikov on Broadway in 1980 earned Burns an Emmy for his work. Burns won the Tony Award for Best Orchestrations in 1999 for Fosse and posthumously in 2002 for Thoroughly Modern Millie, which also garnered him the Drama Desk Award for Outstanding Orchestrations. The latter were won with Doug Besterman. From 1996 until his death, Burns restored many orchestrations for New York City Center's Encores! series — revivals of both his own shows and shows originally orchestrated by others. Burns was inducted into the New England Jazz Hall of Fame in 2004.

Personal life
Burns carefully hid his homosexuality throughout his life. In 2001, Burns died from complications of a recent stroke and pneumonia in Los Angeles, California and was buried on April 13, 2002, in Newton. He was survived by one sister, Nancy Lane (Burns), and three brothers, Leo, Joe, and Gael.

Filmography

Composer 

Lenny (1974)
Piaf (1974)
Lucky Lady (1975)
Movie Movie (1978)
All That Jazz (1979)
Make Me an Offer (TV, 1980)
Urban Cowboy (1980)
Golden Gate (TV, 1981)
Pennies from Heaven (1981)
Side Show (TV, 1981)
Kiss Me Goodbye (1982)
Lights, Camera, Annie! (TV, 1982)
My Favorite Year (1982)
The Phantom of the Opera (TV, 1983)
Star 80 (1983)
National Lampoon's Vacation (1983)
Ernie Kovacs: Between the Laughter (TV, 1984)
The Muppets Take Manhattan (1984)
Moving Violations (1985)
Perfect (1985)
The Christmas Star (TV, 1986)
Penalty Phase (TV, 1986)
Amazing Stories (2 episodes, 1986–1987)
"Magic Saturday" (TV Episode, 1986)
"The 21-Inch Sun" (TV Episode, 1987)
After the Promise (TV, 1987)
In the Mood (1987)
All Dogs Go to Heaven (1989)
Sweet Bird of Youth (TV, 1989)
Bert Rigby, You're a Fool (1989)

Other

Winter Sequence (arrangements, 1954)
Something More! (orchestrator, 1964)
Sweet Charity (orchestrator, 1969)
Move (orchestrator, 1970)
Bananas (orchestrator, 1971)
Pippin (musical) (orchestrator, 1971)
Cabaret (conductor, arranger, supervisor, 1972) 
Lenny (music supervisor, 1974)
Mame (musical director, orchestrator, 1974) 
New York, New York (conductor, supervisor, 1977)
The World's Greatest Lover (orchestrator, 1977)
High Anxiety (orchestrator, 1977)
All That Jazz (conductor, arranger, supervisor, all uncredited, 1979)
Baryshnikov on Broadway (music arranger, TV, 1980)
Urban Cowboy (music adaptor, 1980)
First Family (composer: additional music, uncredited, conductor, adaptor, 1980)
Bring Back Birdie (orchestrator supervisor, 1981)
Pippin: His Life and Times (music arranger, TV, 1981)
History of the World: Part I (orchestrator: "The Spanish Inquisition", 1981)
Annie  (conductor, arranger, 1982)
Jinxed! (reunion scene arranger and orchestrator, 1982)
To Be or Not to Be (orchestrator, 1983)
A Chorus Line (conductor, arranger, 1985)
In the Mood (conductor, orchestrator, 1987)
The Josephine Baker Story (TV, 1991)
Life Stinks (dance orchestrator, 1991)
The Addams Family (additional orchestrator, 1991)
Fosse (orchestrator, TV, 2001)

Soundtracks
Midnight in the Garden of Good and Evil (writer: "Early Autumn", 1997)
Star 80 (music: "Overkill", "Off Ramp", "Improvise", "Funky"; lyrics: "Overkill", "Funky", 1983)

Awards and nominations

See also
 List of jazz arrangers

References
Notes

Bibliography

The ASCAP Biographical Dictionary, Third edition, New York: American Society of Composers, Authors and Publishers (1966)
ASCAP Biographical Dictionary. Fourth edition, compiled for the American Society of Composers, Authors and Publishers by Jaques Cattell Press. New York: R.R. Bowker (1980)
Contemporary Musicians. Profiles of the people in music. Volume 37. Detroit: Gale Group (2002) (biography contains portrait)
Contemporary Theatre, Film, and Television, Volume 12, Detroit: Gale Research (1994) 
Contemporary Theatre, Film, and Television, Volume 24, Detroit: Gale Group (1999) 
International Motion Picture Almanac, 1992 edition, New York: Quigley Publishing Co. (1992) 
International Motion Picture Almanac, 1994 edition, New York: Quigley Publishing Co. (1994) 
International Motion Picture Almanac, 1996 edition, New York: Quigley Publishing Co. (1996) 
The New York Times Biographical Service; A compilation of current biographical information of general interest; Volume 32, Numbers 1–12, Ann Arbor, MI: Bell & Howell Information & Learning Co. (2001)

Bogdanov, Vladimir; Woodstra, Chris and Erlewine, Stephen Thomas All Music Guide to Jazz; The definitive guide to jazz music, Fourth edition,, San Francisco: Backbeat Books (2002)
Bowman, John S. The Cambridge Dictionary of American Biography, Cambridge, England: Cambridge University Press (1995)
Claghorn, Charles Eugene. Biographical Dictionary of American Music, West Nyack, NY: Parker Publishing Co. (1973)
Claghorn, Charles Eugene. Biographical Dictionary of Jazz, Englewood Cliffs, NJ: Prentice Hall (1982)
Hitchcock, H. Wiley and Sadie, Stanley (eds.) The New Grove Dictionary of American Music, four volumes, edited by, London: Macmillan Press (1986) 
Kernfeld, Barry The New Grove Dictionary of Jazz; First edition, two volumes, London: Macmillan Press (1988) 
Kernfeld, Barry The New Grove Dictionary of Jazz, New York: St. Martin's Press (1994)
Kernfeld, Barry The New Grove Dictionary of Jazz; Second edition, three volumes, edited by Barry Kernfeld, London: Macmillan Publishers (2002)
Kinkle, Roger D. The Complete Encyclopedia of Popular Music and Jazz, 1900–1950, Three volumes, New Rochelle, NY: Arlington House Publishers (1974); biographies are located in Volumes 2 and 3
Larkin, Colin (ed.) The Encyclopedia of Popular Music; Third edition, eight volumes, London: Muze (1998); Grove's Dictionaries, New York (1998) 
Rigdon, Walter. The Biographical Encyclopaedia and Who's Who of the American Theatre, edited by Walter Rigdon, New York: James H. Heineman (1966)

External links

 
 
 
 Ralph Burns recordings at the Discography of American Historical Recordings.

1922 births
2001 deaths
American male composers
Songwriters from Massachusetts
Best Original Music Score Academy Award winners
Emmy Award winners
Tony Award winners
Jazz arrangers
Musicians from Newton, Massachusetts
New England Conservatory alumni
20th-century American pianists
LGBT jazz composers
American jazz pianists
American male pianists
American gay musicians
LGBT people from Massachusetts
American LGBT songwriters
20th-century American composers
Jazz musicians from New York (state)
Jazz musicians from Massachusetts
Gay songwriters
Gay composers
20th-century American male musicians
American male jazz musicians
20th-century American LGBT people
21st-century American LGBT people
American male songwriters
American gay writers